Rawalakot Airport  is located at Rawalakot in Azad Kashmir, Pakistan. The airport is surrounded by a forest.

History
Pakistan International Airlines previously operated flights between Rawalakot and Islamabad but ended them in October 2005. Rawalakot Airport remains without commercial service as of March 2016.

Airlines and destinations
No airlines serve Rawalakot as of now.

References

Airports in Azad Kashmir